Mertensophryne schmidti (commonly known as Schmidt's snouted frog) is a species of toad in the family Bufonidae. It is endemic to Democratic Republic of the Congo and only known from the Upemba National Park.

A poorly known species, it is assumed to be a Miombo savanna inhabitant.

Threats to it are unknown. It is named after Karl Patterson Schmidt, American herpetologist.

References

schmidti
Endemic fauna of the Democratic Republic of the Congo
Miombo
Amphibians of the Democratic Republic of the Congo
Amphibians described in 1972
Taxonomy articles created by Polbot